The women's javelin throw event at the 1990 Commonwealth Games was held on 1 February at the Mount Smart Stadium in Auckland.

Results

References

Javelin
1990
1990 in women's athletics